Jessica Tuki (born 28 October 1987 in New Plymouth, Taranaki) is a former New Zealand professional netball and basketball player. She played for the Northern Mystics in the ANZ Championship and was previously in the Silver Ferns in 2006. Tuki replaced Jodi Brown in the team to go to the 2006 Commonwealth Games in Melbourne, after Brown injured her knee. She has previously played for the Western Flyers (2004–05) and the Otago Rebels (2006) in the National Bank Cup. She also trialled for the Tall Ferns basketball team.

During the ANZ Championship era, Tuki has played in almost every position except for Centre.

References

External links 
 Player profile at Southern Steel official website

1987 births
Living people
New Zealand netball players
Commonwealth Games gold medallists for New Zealand
Northern Mystics players
Waikato Bay of Plenty Magic players
ANZ Championship players
Sportspeople from New Plymouth
Commonwealth Games medallists in netball
Netball players at the 2006 Commonwealth Games
Western Flyers players
Otago Rebels players
Southern Steel players
New Zealand international Fast5 players
New Zealand women's basketball players
Medallists at the 2006 Commonwealth Games